CFV may refer to:
CfV (Call for Votes), in Usenet
Chemin de fer du Vivarais, a tourist railway in the South of France
Colorado for Family Values, American advocacy group
M3 Bradley, Cavalry Fighting Vehicle (CFV)